Matthew "Matt" Pryor (born 1960) is an American Republican Party politician. He was the mayor of the city of Troy in the U.S. state of Michigan from 2001 to 2004.

Biography
Pryor grew up in Troy, graduating from Troy High School in 1978. In 1982 he received his B.S. in psychology from the University of Michigan. Upon graduation from college, Pryor began operating a landscape and construction company in Troy and the surrounding area.  Pryor married Patti Turri on August 13, 2011.  

Pryor also has been a noted co-host on Deepertruth Radio with Donald Hartley, known as the "Catholic Defender".

Political career

City council
In 1993, Pryor was elected to the Troy City Council. He served on the council until 1999, including two years as Mayor pro-tem.

Mayor of Troy

In 2001, he was elected Mayor of Troy.

In his 2004 re-election bid he was defeated by former councilmember Louise Schilling.

County commissioner

In 2006 Pryor won the Republican primary for an Oakland County Commissioner representing a large portion of Troy and Clawson. He lost in a surprise defeat to Democrat Tim Burns in the November election. This portion of Oakland county traditionally votes Republican.

State Representative

Pryor is running for State Representative, with the Republican Primary on August 7, 2012.

References

1960 births
Living people
Mayors of places in Michigan
University of Michigan College of Literature, Science, and the Arts alumni
People from Troy, Michigan